The Earth Is Blue as an Orange is a 2020 documentary film, directed and written by Iryna Tsilyk, who won the Directing Award in the "World Cinema Documentary” category for the film at the 2020 Sundance Film Festival.

Synopsis 
Single mother Hanna and her four children live in the front-line war zone of Donbas, Ukraine. While the outside world is made up of bombings and chaos, the family is managing to keep their home as a safe haven, full of life and full of light.  Every member of the family has a passion for cinema, motivating them to shoot a film inspired by their own life during a time of war.
The creative process raises the question of what kind of power the magical world of cinema could have during times of disaster. How to picture war through fiction? For Hanna and the children, transforming trauma into a work of art is the ultimate way to stay human.

Production 
The film is produced by Anna Kapustina ("Albatros Communicos", Ukraine) and Giedrė Žickytė ("Moonmakers", Lithuania) with the support of Ukrainian State Film Agency, Lithuanian Film Centre, IDFA Bertha Fund (Netherlands).

Release
It was selected for the official program of 2020 Berlin International Film Festival (Generation 14+), the 2020 International Documentary Film Festival Amsterdam (Best of Fests), Documentary Selection by European Film Academy 2020, 2020 Hot Docs Canadian International Documentary Festival, 2020 Copenhagen International Documentary Film Festival, 2020 Thessaloniki Documentary Festival, 2020 Adelaide Film Festival and more than 100 other International film festivals.

The film had theatrical distribution in Ukraine, Lithuania, France, Italy.

Characters 
 Myroslava Trofymchuk
 Hanna Gladka
 Stanislav Gladky
 Anastasiia Trofymchuk
 Vladyslav Trofymchuk

Reception 
Guy Lodge, writing for Variety, wrote, "It’s an apt inversion for a documentary in which the roles of filmmaker, viewer and subject are as inextricably fused as life and art". Amber Wilkinson of Screen International wrote, "Iryna Tsilyk offers an intimate and surprisingly playful family’s eye view of life in the Ukraine warzone in her debut feature documentary, which focuses on the Trofymchuk-Gladky clan".

Awards and nominations 
 WINNER: Directing Award: World Cinema Documentary of 2020 Sundance Film Festival, USA 2020
 WINNER: Best Cinematography award of 2020 International Documentary Association Awards, USA 
 WINNER: Spotlight Award of Cinema Eye Honors, USA 2021
 WINNER: Documentary Competition Grand Jury Prize of Seattle International Film Festival, USA 2021
 WINNER: ZIFF Grand Award of Zinebi - Bilbao International Documentary and Short Film Festival, Spain 2020
 WINNER: Grand Prix of Millenium Docs Against Gravity film festival, Poland 2020
 WINNER: DOCU/World award of Docudays UA International Human Rights Documentary Film Festival, Ukraine 2020
 WINNER: DOCU/Ukraine award of Docudays UA International Human Rights Documentary Film Festival, Ukraine 2020
 WINNER: Award for Best Cinematography of Millenium Docs Against Gravity film festival, Poland 2020
 WINNER: Special Prize of the Jury of Artdocfest/Riga, Latvia 2021
 WINNER: Best Documentary Film of Ukrainian Film Critics Award "Kinokolo", Ukraine 2020
 WINNER: Best Debut (Premia Hera "Nuovi Talenti") of Biografilm Festival, Italy 2020
 WINNER: Best Human Rights Doc of Dokufest, Kosovo 2020
 WINNER: Best Documentary Film of Five Lakes Film Festival, Germany 2020
 WINNER: Jury's Prize for Best film of Al Este Festival de Cine Peru, 2020
 WINNER: Press Jury's prize for Best film of Al Este Festival de Cine Peru, 2020
 WINNER: DoXX Award of Tallgrass Film Festival, USA 2020
 WINNER: Bydgoszcz ART.DOC Award, Poland 2020
 WINNER: "Movies That Matter" special prize of ZagrebDox, Croatia 2021
 WINNER: "Best Documentary film" of Golden Dzyga awards, Ukraine 2021
 WINNER: "Best Documentary film" of MajorDocs, Spain 2021
 WINNER: “Best co-production film of the year" of the Lithuanian National Film Award “Sidabrinė gervė”, 2022
 WINNER: Jury Special Award of Ânûû-rû Âboro Film Festival, 2022
 Special Mention: International competition of Underhill Fest, Montenegro 2020
 Special Jury Mention: of CineDOC Tbilisi, Georgia 2020
 Special Mention: Different Tomorrow category at Reykjavik International Film Festival, Iceland 2020
 Special Jury Mention: Zurich Film Festival, Switzerland 2020
 Special Mention: Human Rights Film Award of Verzio Film Festival, Hungary 2020
 Special Mention: Minsk IFF Listapad, Belarus 2020
 Special Jury Mention: Premiers Plans - Angers Film Festival, France 2021

Reviews 
 The Earth Is Blue As an Orange review – subtle doc tells Ukrainian family’s war story. Phil Hoad, The Guardian
 The Earth Is Blue as an Orange: Film Review. Guy Lodge, Variety
 The Earth Is Blue As An Orange: CPH:DOX review. Amber Wilkinson, Screen International
 Review: The Earth Is Blue as an Orange (2020), by Iryna Tsilyk. Marko Stojiljković, Ubiquarian
 Review: The Earth Is Blue as an Orange. Teresa Vena, Cineuropa
 Orange is the New Blue: Film Review. Zoe Aiano, EEFB
 The Earth Is Blue as an Orange: Film Review, German. Lida Bach, Moviebreak
 The healing power of cinema: Film Review. Lauren Wissot, Modern Times Review
 The Earth Is Blue as an Orange: Film Review. Davide Abbatescianni, Filmexplorer

References

External links 

 

2020 films
Ukrainian documentary films
2020 documentary films
Sundance Film Festival award winners
War in Donbas films